Onythes is a genus of moths in the family Erebidae.

Species
Onythes colombiana
Onythes flavicosta
Onythes pallidicosta

References

Natural History Museum Lepidoptera generic names catalog

Phaegopterina
Moth genera